Guri i Plakës is a rock formation near Dobroševac in the municipality of Glogovac. It lies at the foot of Mount Čičavica and was designated a natural monument in 2006 under the category number of MN/034.

History
The rocks are next to the highway from Glogovac to Obilić, and the railway line from Kosovo Polje to Peć runs between them. A single rock was dynamited to make way for the track in 1936. Many myths and legends have arisen around the stones.

Gallery

References

Tourist attractions in Kosovo